Fiona Kelly may refer to:

Fiona Kelly (writer) on All Saints (season 12)
Fiona Kelly, character in Raw (TV series)
Fiona Kelly, singer on The Voice UK (series 3)